Milan Schere is a Canadian matte painter and filmmaker, best known for his work on Tron: Legacy. In 2011 he received a best Visual Effects in Canadian cinema award nomination by the Academy of Canadian Cinema and Television for his 1907 New York City skyline period matte painting work in the feature film A Dangerous Method.

Before becoming a visual effects artist, Schere earned a master's degree in Digital Effects from Bournemouth University, England. He remained in England, working in broadcast design on a number of popular BBC documentaries.

In addition to his feature film work, he is also known to fans of the television series Vikings for the numerous digital backdrops he created.

Schere co-authored the book D'artiste Matte Painting 3: Digital Artists Master Class in which he shares of his work process and industry experiences throughout his career. He has also published papers on the subject of matte painting. Interviews of Schere have been featured in multiple print and online media publications.

His filmography also includes The Thing, Scott Pilgrim vs. the World, The Twilight Saga: Breaking Dawn – Part 1, The Vow, Dredd, Silent Hill: Revelation 3D, Mama and RoboCop.

Schere has overall had a great influence on the matte painting community, as he was on the forefront of camera projection mapping, openly sharing his techniques, and also the first digital matte artist to implement the 3D texturing tool Mari into his working process.

Today, Schere is living with his wife and children in Vancouver, British Columbia, Canada.

Awards
Canadian Screen Awards for Best Achievement in Visual Effects
for A Dangerous Method (2011)
Canadian Screen Awards for Best Achievement in Visual Effects
for Resident Evil: Retribution (2012)

See also 
Dylan Cole
David Luong
Christopher Leith Evans
Michael Pangrazio
Digital matte artist
Matte painting
The Foundry
Camera projection mapping

References 
Uesugi, Y. et al., 2008. d'artiste Matte Painting 2. Adelaide, SA, AUS: Ballistic Publishing
Schere, M. "et al.", 2009. Advanced Photoshop #56. Bournemouth, UK: Imagine Publishing
Schere, M. "et al.", 2013. d'artiste Matte Painting 3. Adelaide, SA, AUS: Ballistic Publishing
..., 2013. 3D Total #Feb.

External links 

 Artist's Official Site
MR. X Inc. at The Foundry
 Career Success and Wedded Bliss
FX Guide
 TR2N back to the Big Screen
Case Study Forum Post
Ballistic Publishing
Digital Matte Art in VFX Production today

1982 births
Canadian painters
Matte painters
Living people